Mohamed Amine Saïdoun (born February 26, 1989 in Bouïra, Algeria) is an Algerian football player who is currently playing as a defender for ASO Chlef in the Algerian Ligue Professionnelle 1.

On May 5, 2008, Saïdoun made his first team debut for USM Alger in the Algerian Championnat National, starting against CR Belouizdad and getting replaced at halftime. He would go on to make two more starts before the end of the season, against CA Bordj Bou Arreridj and NA Hussein Dey.

International career
Saïdoun is the captain of the Algerian Under-20 National Team. He most recently played in a qualifier against Mauritania for the 2009 African Youth Championship.

References

1989 births
Algeria youth international footballers
Algeria under-23 international footballers
Algerian Ligue Professionnelle 1 players
Algerian footballers
ASO Chlef players
Living people
People from Bouïra
USM Alger players
Association football defenders
21st-century Algerian people